Goniofusus turris is a species of sea snail, a marine gastropod mollusk in the family Fasciolariidae, the spindle snails, the tulip snails and their allies.

Description

Distribution
This marine species occurs off Acapulco, Mexico.

References

 Vermeij G.J. & Snyder M.A. (2018). Proposed genus-level classification of large species of Fusininae (Gastropoda, Fasciolariidae). Basteria. 82(4-6): 57-82

External links
 Valenciennes, A. (1832). Coquilles univalves marines de l'Amérique équinoxiale, recueillies pendant le voyage de MM. A. de Humboldt et A. Bonpland. In: Humboldt, A. von & Bonpland, A. (Eds), Recueil d'observations de zoologie et d'anatomie comparée: faites dans l'océan atlantique, dans l'intérieur du nouveau continent et dans la mer du sud pendant les années 1799, 1800, 1801, 1802 et 1803. Vol. 2: 262-339, pl. 57

turris
Gastropods described in 1832